Anthony Masterson (born 5 January 1983) is a retired Irish sportsperson who played Gaelic football for Wexford Senior Football Championship team Castletown Liam Mellows and the Wexford intercounty team since making his debut in 2005. Before joining the senior panel he was a Leinster Junior Championship with Wexford and later played in the All Ireland final but lost out to Cork.

On 23 October 2016, Anthony Masterson retired due to a long-standing injury.

References

External links
 GAA profile at gaainfo.com

1983 births
Living people
Gaelic football goalkeepers
Wexford inter-county Gaelic footballers